Ealing, Southall (also Ealing Southall) is a constituency created in 1974 and represented in the House of Commons of the UK Parliament since 2007 by Virendra Sharma of the Labour Party.

Constituency profile

The constituency has relatively good road and rail transport, and numerous small to medium-size green spaces, and has had as many as three tube stations at its eastern extremes of its boundaries.  Southall and Norwood Green, forming the western bulk of the seat, feature a high British Asian proportion of the population since the 1960s. British Indian ethnicity is the largest single ethnic group.  British Asians account for 51% of the population, as at the 2011 census, the majority of this minority is of Indian ethnicity (29.6%), with significant Hindu and Muslim populations, with the highest number of Sikh residents in any constituency in Britain at over 20%.  The Afro-Caribbean community amounts to 8% according to the latest census statistics.  The seat has generally modest incomes and the vast majority of housing is modest terraced, semi-detached or mid-rise 20th century blocks of flats.  The east of the seat is formed by Hanwell and West Ealing.

Political history
The seat has been served by three successive Labour Party MPs since its inception in 1974, with majorities ranging between 13.8% and 49% of the vote; the latter was achieved in 2017, which was not a landslide year for the party. The length of tenure and size of majorities mean that practical analyses consider Ealing Southall a safe seat. The 2015 result made the seat the 25th safest of Labour's 232 seats by percentage of majority. The larger predecessor seat, created in 1945, was held by Labour throughout its existence.

Boundaries

1983–1997: The London Borough of Ealing wards of Dormers Wells, Elthorne, Glebe, Mount Pleasant, Northcote, Northfield, Walpole, and Waxlow.

1997–2010: The London Borough of Ealing wards of Dormers Wells, Ealing Common, Elthorne, Glebe, Mount Pleasant, Northcote, Northfield, Walpole, and Waxlow.

2010–present: The London Borough of Ealing wards of Dormers Wells, Elthorne, Lady Margaret, Northfield, Norwood Green, Southall Broadway, and Southall Green.

The constituency takes in the south western third of population of the London Borough of Ealing in west London and is traversed its extreme length by the Great Western Main Line (railway). The other Ealing constituencies are Ealing North, and Ealing Central and Acton.

2010-implemented boundary review
The Boundary Commission for England made minor changes. Part of Greenford Broadway ward and tiny parts of Hobbayne ward and Dormers Wells ward were transferred from the constituency of Ealing North to Ealing, Southall. Tiny parts of Hobbayne ward and Dormers Wells ward were also transferred to Ealing North. Walpole ward, and parts of Ealing Broadway ward and Ealing Common ward were transferred from the seat into new Ealing Central and Acton.

Members of Parliament

Elections

Elections in the 2010s

Elections in the 2000s

At the 2001 Election, the Electoral Commissions book "Election 2001"  records the following three candidates with party names rejected for not being recorded on the register of political parties:
Dhillon – Independent Community Candidate Empowering Change
Bhutta – Qari
Lit – Chairman of Sunrise Radio

Elections in the 1990s

Elections in the 1980s

See also 
 List of parliamentary constituencies in London
 2007 Ealing Southall by-election

Notes

References

External links
Labour Party's Ealing Southall website
Ealing Liberal Democrats
Ealing Conservatives
Ealing loony candidate
By-elections blog
UK Polling Report Blog
Statement by Ealing Southall 2010 major party candidates on key issues
Ealing Gazette Election Website
Politics Resources (Election results from 1922 onwards)
Electoral Calculus (Election results from 1955 onwards)

Politics of the London Borough of Ealing
Parliamentary constituencies in London
Constituencies of the Parliament of the United Kingdom established in 1983